The  Little League World Series took place from August 25 through August 29 in Williamsport, Pennsylvania. The Hamtramck National Little League of Hamtramck, Michigan, defeated the West Auburn Little League of Auburn, California, in the championship game of the 13th Little League World Series.

This was the first year that the LLWS was played at Howard J. Lamade Stadium. Two-time defending champion Monterrey, Mexico, was ruled ineligible to compete due to violations of player residency requirements.

Teams

 The European qualifier, from Bad Kissingen Airfield in what was then West Germany, was unable to travel to the tournament.

Championship bracket

References

External links
Little League World Series
Line scores for the 1959 LLWS

Little League World Series
Little League World Series
Little League World Series